The 1984 Brazilian Grand Prix, officially known as the XIII Grande Prêmio Brasil de Fórmula 1 was a Formula One motor race held on 25 March 1984 in Rio de Janeiro. The race was contested over 61 laps of Jacarepaguá Circuit and was the first race of the 1984 Formula One World Championship. This race was the 13th edition of the Brazilian Grand Prix, the ninth time that the Jacarepaguá Circuit race held a Grand Prix, and marked the debut of Ayrton Senna in Formula One.

In qualifying, Italian driver, Elio de Angelis from Team Lotus claimed pole for the second time in his career as he finished ahead of fellow Italian driver, Michele Alboreto who was in the Ferrari. In the race it was Alain Prost in the McLaren car who would take out his second win in Brazil. He finished ahead of Keke Rosberg who was in the Williams with de Angelis finishing in third.

Qualifying
Elio de Angelis claimed the first pole position of the season in his Lotus-Renault from the Ferrari of Michele Alboreto in his first race for the Prancing Horse. Derek Warwick, in his first race for Renault, was 3rd on the grid with the McLaren-TAG of Alain Prost 4th, Prost returning to the team he started his career with after three seasons with Renault. Reigning World Champion (and local favourite) Nelson Piquet qualified 7th in his Brabham-BMW, while another Brazilian, a Formula One rookie by the name of Ayrton Senna qualified 17th for his first ever Grand Prix in his Toleman-Hart.

Race
With only 220 litres of fuel allowed, many teams on the grid tried various ways to save fuel from evaporating in the Rio heat. McLaren covered their cars in tin foil while others such as Lotus and Renault attempted to freeze their fuel in order to actually fit more in. The Renault team also had a sophisticated (for 1984) electronic fuel monitoring system which they hoped would give them an advantage over their rivals.

Alboreto got the jump at the start and led early from Warwick and de Angelis, with the McLarens of Niki Lauda 4th and Prost fighting back from a bad start. The Frenchman had bogged down at the green light with too few revs and was only 10th at the end of the first lap (Piquet also made a bad start after almost stalling at the green light and much to the agony of the crowd, was only in 23rd halfway through the first lap). Not having done a practice start in the car, during the warm-up Prost had asked Lauda what revs to use at the start. Lauda told him no less than 10,000 but on the grid Prost felt this was too high and dropped to 8,000 only to find Lauda had been correct. Despite this he was beginning to show the superior race speed which would become the story of the season. Lauda quickly passed de Angelis and when he passed Warwick for 2nd at the end of the back straight on lap 10, the McLaren's right rear hit the Renault's left front tyre. The hit damaged Warwick's suspension, leading to suspension failure for the Renault driver late in the race when running second.

Senna was the first retirement of the 1984 season with turbo failure on lap 8.

Alboreto's race was ruined by a loose bolt in his car's right front brake caliper which released all the brake fluid and caused the brake to overheat, resulting in a couple of spins and a pit stop where buckets of water were thrown over the brakes in a vain attempt at cooling it. Lauda was leading by some 40 seconds on lap 34 when the wires to his McLaren's battery came loose causing electrical failure. After almost stalling his Brabham-BMW at the start, Piquet finished an unhappy race on lap 32 when the BMW engine failed coming onto the pit straight.

After passing Warwick for the lead, Prost, who was in the pits for a tyre change when Lauda coasted in to retire, lost the lead back to the Englishman when he made his second stop for tyres. He regained the lead for good following Warwick's retirement and ran out the winner by 40 seconds from the Williams-Honda of Keke Rosberg and the Lotus of de Angelis. For Rosberg it was his third successive second place in the Brazilian Grand Prix, though it was the only one in which he was not disqualified. Eddie Cheever finish 4th in the Alfa Romeo, while Renault's Patrick Tambay was classified in 6th after running out of fuel on the last lap, losing 5th to another F1 rookie, Martin Brundle in his Tyrrell-Ford.

Brundle, and the Tyrrell team, would later be disqualified from the season for technical infringements. This promoted Tambay to 5th and the Arrows-Ford of Thierry Boutsen to 6th.

Classification

Qualifying

Race

Championship standings after the race

Drivers' Championship standings

Constructors' Championship standings

Note: Only the top five positions are included for both sets of standings. Points accurate at final declaration of results. Tyrrell and its drivers were subsequently disqualified and their points reallocated.

References

External links
Comments on Ayrton Senna @ 1984 Brazilian GP (archived)

Brazilian Grand Prix
Brazilian Grand Prix
Grand Prix
Brazilian Grand Prix